Cody Creek is a  long 2nd order tributary to the Fisher River in Surry County, North Carolina.

Variant names
According to the Geographic Names Information System, it has also been known historically as:
Codys Creek

Course
Cody Creek rises in a pond at Dobson, North Carolina.  Cody Creek then flows southeast to join the Fisher River about 1 mile east-southeast of Fairview.

Watershed
Cody Creek drains  of area, receives about 48.7 in/year of precipitation, has a wetness index of 378.07, and is about 30% forested.

See also
List of rivers of North Carolina

References

Rivers of North Carolina
Rivers of Surry County, North Carolina